Simone Mocellini (born 5 May 1998) is an Italian cross-country skier. He obtained his first World Cup podium in December 2022 placing second in the sprint event in Beitostølen, Norway. He also placed second in the sprint in the Val di Fiemme round of the 2022–23 Tour de Ski.

Cross-country skiing results
All results are sourced from the International Ski Federation (FIS).

World Championships

World Cup

Season standings

Individual podiums
 2 podiums – (1 , 1 )

References

External links

1998 births
Living people
Italian male cross-country skiers